Gianfranco Franchini (December 17, 1938 – April 21, 2009) was an Italian architect.

Biography
Born in Genoa and educated at the Polytechnic University of Milan, Franchini is best known for his collaboration with Renzo Piano and Richard Rogers in designing the Centre Georges Pompidou in Paris, France. While his colleagues continued on to major international architectural commissions, however, Franchini returned to Italy, where he designed smaller scale projects, including a library in Chieri, the International Civic Library in Bordighera, and the restoration of the Mackenzie Castle.

He died in Genoa.

References

External links
Centre Pompidou Official Website

1938 births
2009 deaths
Architects from Genoa
20th-century Italian architects